Udailal Anjana (Hindi: उदयलाल आँजना; born 5 May 1951; Chhoti Sadri, Rajasthan, India) is a senior Indian National Congress leader who currently serves as the Minister of Co-operation in the Rajasthan government and as the Vice President of the Rajasthan Pradesh Congress Committee. As a member of the Congress party, he has represented the Nimbahera assembly seat in Rajasthan thrice. He was previously a member of the Indian Parliament for the Chittorgarh constituency of Rajasthan, a feat that he achieved after defeating the then Union Defence Minister Jaswant Singh.

Apart from politics, he is a prominent businessman; chairperson of UB Group; and a social worker. In 2010, he founded Harish Anjana Foundation, a non-profit organisation.

References

Living people
Members of the Rajasthan Legislative Assembly
People from Chittorgarh district
1951 births
India MPs 1998–1999
Lok Sabha members from Rajasthan
Indian National Congress politicians from Rajasthan